The tournament held between November and December in Las Vegas, Nevada. The 2015 tournament was played in December 21 and 22 at Cox Pavilion, the 2016 Tournament will be played November 25 and 26 at the Thomas & Mack Center. Each team will play four games in the Classic – the first two at on-campus sites and the final two rounds in Las Vegas.

Brackets 
* – Denotes overtime period

2016

2015

References

College men's basketball competitions in the United States
College basketball competitions
Basketball competitions in Las Vegas
2013 establishments in Nevada
2016 disestablishments in Nevada
Sports in Las Vegas
Basketball competitions in Nevada
Recurring sporting events established in 2013
Recurring sporting events disestablished in 2016